Glenside station is a SEPTA Regional Rail station along the SEPTA Main Line, located at the intersection of Easton Road and Glenside Avenue in Glenside, Pennsylvania. It is served by the Warminster Line and the Lansdale/Doylestown Line, both of which split at Carmel Junction immediately west of Glenside station. The station is not wheelchair-accessible, but has a ticket office. The first train from the station departs at 4:29 A.M, while the last train arrives at the station at 1:03 A.M. The station is relatively busy with a train arriving at least every 30 minutes, even at non-peak hours.

Glenside is also well-served by the Airport Line, as the majority of Warminster Line trains run through to and from Philadelphia International Airport. A few Airport Line trains originate or terminate at Glenside, often using the siding at the west end of the inbound platform. In FY 2013, the station had 1064 average weekday boardings and 1197 average weekday alightings.

There is a ticket office and waiting room at Glenside, which is open on weekdays and sells tickets until early afternoon. An espresso bar named Elcy's Cafe has been operating in the station since 2000.

Station layout
Glenside has two low-level side platforms.

References

External links

SEPTA – Glenside Station
Glenside RDG Station (The Blue Comet.com)
 Easton Road entrance from Google Maps Street View

SEPTA Regional Rail stations
Former Reading Company stations
Railway stations in Montgomery County, Pennsylvania
Stations on the SEPTA Main Line